This is a list of members of the Northern Territory Legislative Assembly from 1997 to 2001.

 Blain CLP MLA Barry Coulter resigned on 18 June 1999. CLP candidate Terry Mills won the resulting by-election on 31 July.
 Wanguri Labor MLA John Bailey resigned on 18 June 1999. Labor candidate Paul Henderson won the resulting by-election on 31 July.
 Port Darwin CLP MLA Shane Stone resigned on 21 February 2000. CLP candidate Sue Carter won the resulting by-election on 11 March.
 The member for Braitling, Loraine Braham, resigned from the Country Liberal Party on 7 February 2001, after losing party endorsement to recontest her seat at the coming election. She served out the remainder of her term as an independent.

See also
1997 Northern Territory general election

Members of Northern Territory parliaments by term
21st-century Australian politicians
20th-century Australian politicians